Hospital Villa Baviera Airport,  is an airport serving Villa Baviera, a village in the Maule Region of Chile.

The airport is southeast of Villa Baviera, and runs along the north shore of the Perquilauquén River. There is rising terrain in all quadrants except southwest.

See also

Transport in Chile
List of airports in Chile

References

External links
OpenStreetMap - Hospital Villa Baviera
OurAirports - Hospital Villa Baviera
FallingRain - Hospital Villa Baviera Airport

Airports in Maule Region